The 2022 World Ringette Championships (2022 WRC) was an international ringette tournament and the 14th (XIV) World Ringette Championships. The tournament was organized by the International Ringette Federation (IRF) and was contested in Espoo, Finland, from October 31 – November 6, 2022. The President of Finland, Sauli Niinistö, acted as a patron of the event. The previous world championships, the 2021 WRC, had been planned to be hosted by Finland in Helsinki, but were cancelled due to the Covid-19 pandemic.

The main event took place at the Espoo Metro Areena, located in the Tapiola sports park. One exhibition game took place at Marli Areena (Rajupaja Areena) in Turku, Finland, and another at the Kisakallio Sport Institute in Lohja. "Come Try Ringette" events were organized for schools in the area as well as the general public.

Three competitions took place take place: the Senior Pool (Seniors)  Sam Jacks Pool, the Junior Pool (Juniors), and the President's Pool (developing ringette nations). The 2022 Junior competition included athletes who were Under-21 years of age (U21). Prior to the main competition, a series of exhibition games were played which included a different national teams and two Finland U18 teams: U18 2004 (players born in 2004) and U18 2005 (players born in 2005). A youth tournament was played at the Tapiola Arena and Matinkylä ice rinks.

Ringette Finland and Kiekko-Espoo Ringette hosted "International Ringette Festival 2022", an international junior ringette tournament in Espoo from November 3 to November 6, 2022. The Festival included 16 teams, each in the age divisions of U16, U14 and U12, and was open to ringette teams from Canada, Finland, and Sweden. All teams played at least six games. U16 and U14 played 2 x 15 minutes (stopped clock) and U12 played 30 minutes (running time).

Overview 
The 2022 World Ringette Championships was the first World Ringette Championships since its cancellation in 2021 due to the Covid-19 pandemic. The deciding format for each winning team depended upon the division. While exhibition games were played, three major competitions took place in three different pools with different formats:

 Senior Pool: Known officially as the "Sam Jacks Series" or the "Sam Jacks Pool". The games are played in 4 x 15 minute quarters. Though this pool is traditionally a three-game-series between Team Canada Senior and Team Finland Senior, the 2022 WRC involved a two-game series. The winning team was awarded the senior world title, the senior gold medal, and the Sam Jacks Trophy.
 Junior Pool: The junior pool games were played in 4 x 15 minute quarters. Though this pool is traditionally a three-game-series between Team Canada Junior and Team Finland Junior, the 2022 WRC involved a two-game series. For the 2022 WRC the Junior Pool was organized for players Under-21 years of age ( U21). The winning team was awarded the junior world title, the junior gold medal, and the Juuso Wahlsten Trophy.
 President's Pool: Teams from developing ringette countries included Team USA, Team Sweden, and Team Czech Republic. The winning team was awarded President's world title, the President's gold medal, and the President's Trophy.

Seniors 
Senior players from Team Canada Senior, Team Finland Senior, Team Sweden Senior, Team Czech Republic, and Team USA Senior competed.

Team Finland and Team Canada competed in the Senior Pool. Team USA, Team Sweden, and Team Czech Republic competed in the President's Pool. Team Slovakia did not compete in the 2022 WRC.

Juniors 
Junior players (Under-21) competed in the Junior Pool which included athletes from Team Canada Junior (U21) and Team Finland Junior (U21). Team USA, Team Sweden, and Team Czechia (Czech Republic) did not have junior national teams compete. Two youth Finland U18 (Under-18) teams also competed in two separate exhibition games.

Finland U18 exhibition 
A series of exhibition games took place with two Finland U18 teams (Under-18) competing against the Team Sweden Seniors and the Team USA Seniors. The first Finnish team included players born in 2004 (Finland U18 2004) while the second included players born in 2005 (Finland U18 2005).

Teams

Venues 
The Espoo Metro Areena acted as the main venue for the 2022 World Ringette Championships. The Tapiola Ice Hall served as a venue for some of the 2022 WRC exhibition games, some of the President's Pool games, and also served as one of two venues for the youth tournament. The Matinkylä ice rink was used as another rink for the youth tournament.

One exhibition game was played in Turku at the Marli Areena (Rajupaja Areena), and another at the Kisakallio Sport Institute in Lohja.

Main venues

Exhibition venues

Game results 
Three separate competitions took place: the Senior Pool, the Junior Pool (Under-21 years of age  U21), and the President's Pool. Exhibition games were also contested. Two Finland U18 teams competed against the 2022 Sweden Senior team and the 2022 USA Senior team in exhibition.

Exhibition games

Senior Pool 
The Senior Pool is also known as the "Sam Jacks Pool" or "Sam Jacks Series". The Senior Pool involved two games between the 2022 Team Canada Seniors and the 2022 Team Finland Seniors.

The Senior Pool champions were decided using a point system: 2 points for a win, 1 point for a tie, and 0 points for a loss. In the event of a tie game, overtime was not to be allowed in the first game but was to be allowed in the second game. If the second game had resulted in a tie, the teams were to play a period of overtime which would have been considered its own game and would have started from 0-0. The first overtime period would have been 15 minutes long. If there was no clear winner, a sudden-death overtime period was to be played next.

Points

Junior Pool 

The Junior Pool was played between the 2022 Canadian Junior national team and the 2022 Finland Junior national team. The competition was for players Under-21 (U21).

The Junior Pool was played in the same format as the WRC 2022 Senior Pool with two-games and possible overtime periods planned if the second game had resulted in a tie. Sudden-death overtime was to be played if the first overtime period resulted in a tie.

Points

President's Pool 

Three countries competed in the President's Pool: Team USA Senior, the Team Czech, and Team Sweden Senior. Each team played two games against each other. Teams collected points per game: a win was worth 2 points and a loss resulted in 0 points. If a game resulted in a tie, the game was planned to go into sudden-death overtime.

The winner of the first round advanced directly to the final. Second and third in the pool played in the playoffs where the winner there faced the winner of the first round in the final. The winner of the final was the winner of the President's Pool and was awarded with the President's Pool gold medal and the President's Trophy.

Points

Final standings

Senior Pool results

Junior Pool results

President's Pool results

Awards

Junior MVP

  Team Canada Junior #51 Mégane Fortin
  Team Finland Junior #12 Minka Levander

  Team Canada Junior #14 Vail Ketsa
  Team Finland Junior #20 Minka Tiihonen

  Team Canada #14 Vail Ketsa
  Team Finland #20 Minka Tiihonen

  Team Finland Jr #20 Minka Tiihonen

Senior MVP

  Team Finland #10 Anne Pohjola
  Team Canada #7 Jenny Snowdon

  Team Finland #30 Maria Perkkola
  Team Canada #2 Gillian Dreger

  Team Finland #10 Anne Pohjola
  Team Canada #7 Jenny Snowdon

  Team Finland #11 Susanna Tapani

Rosters

Seniors

Team Finland Senior
The 2022 Team Finland Senior team included the following:

Team Canada Senior
The 2022 Team Canada Senior team will competed in the 2022 World Ringette Championships. The 2022 Team Canada Senior team included the following:

Juniors

Team Finland Junior
A total of 18 players competed for the U21 team in 2022. Two separate teams, Finland U18, competed against national teams who were in the 2022 President's Pool. One team involved players born in 2004, the other in 2005.

Team Canada Junior
The 2022 Team Canada Junior Under-21 team (U21) was chosen during a selection camp held in Mississauga, Ontario. For 2022 WRC, athletes were named to Ringette Canada’s, "Junior National Travelling Team Roster". This roster was made up of 20 "Playing Roster" athletes, and 2 "Development Roster" athletes. Development Roster athletes were only added to the Playing Roster if the athlete was deemed unfit to play for medical reasons and thus needed to be removed from the Playing Roster.

Finland U18
Two separate teams, Finland U18 2004 (players born in 2004) and Finland U18 2005 (players born in 2005) competed against the 2022 teams of Team Sweden Senior and Team USA Senior.

Finland U18 2004

Finland U18 2005

President's Pool

Team Sweden Senior
The 2022 Sweden Senior team included the following:

Team USA Senior
The 2022 Team USA Senior team included the following:

Team Czech Republic Senior
The 2022 Czech Republic Senior team included the following:

See also 
 World Ringette Championships
 International Ringette Federation
  Canada national ringette team
  Finland national ringette team
  Sweden national ringette team
  United States national ringette team
  Czech Republic national ringette team

References 

Ringette
Ringette competitions
World Ringette Championships
World Ringette Championships
International sports competitions hosted by Finland
2020s in Finland
World Ringette Championships
World Ringette Championships
Ringette
Ringette